Brad Milosevic (born 26 May 1989) is an Australian long-distance runner. He won the half marathon at the Oceania Marathon and Half Marathon Championships (2014) in 1:05:33. and the 2014 NSW Short Course Cross Country race.
Major Titles & International CV:
2017 Nagoya City Half Marathon, Japan-                                         Champion,
2016 NSW State Open Championships,  10,000m -Champion,
2015 Melbourne Marathon-                                  Champion,
2015 Sydney City 2 Surf -                                                               Champion
2015 NSW State long-course & short-course XC Championships -(2nd)
2015 Nagoya City half marathon, Japan-                                          Champion,
2014 Blackmores Sydney Australian half-marathon -Champion,
2014 Gold Coast Oceania half-marathon-                                        Champion,
2014 Sydney City 2 Surf-                                                               (2nd),
2014 NSW State 5,000m -                                                                     Champion,
2014 NSW State short course Cross-Country-                                  Champion He was born in 1989 and grew up in Kings Langley near Sydney.

Running career
Milosevic rose in Australia's running scene with Girraween Athletics Club. In 2014, he came second in the City2Surf (Sydney). On 9 August 2015, he won the 2015 edition of the City2Surf race. On 18 October 2015, he fulfilled the Olympic "B" standard when he finished the 2015 Melbourne Marathon in 2:16:00.

In 2017, Milosevic competed in the men's marathon at the World Championships in Athletics held in London, placing 60th in the time of 2:25:14.

References

External links 
 Brad Milosevic at Athletics Australia
 Brad Milosevic at Australian Athletics Historical Results

1989 births
Living people
Australian male long-distance runners
Place of birth missing (living people)